Sir Charles Cecil Stevens  (5 July 1840, Tahiti – 24 March 1909) was an Australian civil servant who was the lieutenant governor of the province of Bengal, representing the British Raj in India. He is credited for having supervised the foundation of the Sidrapong Hydel Power Station, the first of its kind in Asia.

He was educated at the University of Melbourne. He died in Kensington in 1909 following a bout of influenza.

References

1841 births
1909 deaths
British governors of Bengal
Indian Civil Service (British India) officers
Knights Commander of the Order of the Star of India
Lieutenant-governors of Bengal